The Billboard Streaming Songs chart ranks each week's most-streamed radio songs, on-demand songs and videos on leading online music services in the United States. In 2018, 20 songs by 24 artist reached the top.

The first number one song of the year was Ed Sheeran's "Perfect" alongside Beyonce. Post Malone's and 21 Savage's "Rockstar" spent 12 weeks atop in late 2017 and topped the chart for two more weeks in January for a total of 14 weeks. "God's Plan" by Canadian musician Drake reached the top in early February and topped the charts for 11 consecutive weeks. Furthermore, it became the second song to be ever streamed more than 100 million times within one week, since Baauer's "Harlem Shake" in early 2013. Drake replaced himself with "Nice for What" for four weeks in April and May.

Childish Gambino scored his first number one on the chart with "This is America" for three weeks in May and early June. Following the murder of XXXTentacion in Florida, his single "Sad!" became his first to top the chart for two weeks. Drake scored his third and fourth number-one hit in 2018 with "Nonstop" and "In My Feelings" for nine more weeks. Furthermore, "In My Feelings" became the most-streamed songs within a week, accumulating more than 116 million streams—13 million more than "Harlem Shake". Moreover, "In My Feelings" was the third most streamed song of the year, accumulating more than 1.1 billion streams.

Drake was the most-successful artist of the year. "God's Plan", "In My Feelings" and "Nice for What" ranked in the top ten most-streamed songs in the US for 2018. "God's Plan" concluded as the most-streamed song in 2018, with more than 1.5 billion streams.

Chart history

See also
2018 in American music
List of Billboard Hot 100 number-one singles of 2018

References

United States Streaming Songs
Streaming 2018